Virginijus  is a Lithuanian masculine given name. The feminine given form is Virginija. People bearing the name Virginijus include:

Virginijus Baltušnikas (born  1968), Lithuanian football player
Virginijus Pikturna (born  1961), Lithuanian politician
Virginijus Praškevičius (born  1974),  Lithuanian basketball player
Virginijus Šeškus (born 1967), Lithuanian basketball coach
Virginijus Šikšnys (born 1956), Lithuanian biochemist
Virginijus Sinkevičius (born 1990), Lithuanian politician

Lithuanian masculine given names